Knife Lake Township is a township in Kanabec County, Minnesota, United States. The population was 1,049 at the 2000 census.

Geography

Demographics
At the 2000 census, there were 1,049 people, 412 households,and 316 families residing in the township. The racial make-up of the township was 97.90% White, 0.10% African American, 0.67% Native American, 0.29% Asian, 0.19% from other races and 0.86% from two or more races. Hispanic or Latino of any race were 0.19% of the population.

There were 412 households, of which 30.8% had children under the age of 18 living with them, 65.8% were married couples living together, 6.6% had a female householder with no husband present, and 23.3% were non-families. 21.6% of all households were made up of individuals and 9.7% had someone living alone who was 65 years of age or older. The average household size was 2.55 and the average family size was 2.95.

6.0% of the population were under the age of 18, 4.9% from 18 to 24, 26.6% from 25 to 44, 27.9% from 45 to 64 and 14.6% were 65 years of age or older. The median age was 41 years. For every 100 females, there were 107.7 males. For every 100 females age 18 and over, there were 103.1 males.

The median household income was $39,167 and the median family income was $44,083. Males had a median income of $37,031 and females $23,068. The per capita income $19,387. About 4.9% of families and 7.4% of the population were below the poverty line, including 9.2% of those under age 18 and 7.9% of those age 65 or over.

References

Townships in Kanabec County, Minnesota
Townships in Minnesota